South Lancashire, formally called the Southern Division of Lancashire or Lancashire Southern, is a former county constituency of the South Lancashire area in England.  It returned two Members of Parliament (MPs) to the British House of Commons from 1832 to 1861, and then from a very narrow reform of that year, three until it was further split in 1868.

The constituency was created by the Great Reform Act of 1832 by the splitting of Lancashire constituency into Northern and Southern divisions. It was abolished by the Second Reform Act of 1867.

Boundaries

1832–1868: The Hundreds of Salford, and West Derby.

Salford went to form the new South East Lancashire constituency, and West Derby the new South West Lancashire constituency.

Members of Parliament

MPs 1832–1861

Constituency created (1832)

MPs 1861–1868

Elections

Wilbraham's death caused a by-election.

Egerton was elevated to the peerage, becoming 1st Earl of Ellesmere and causing a by-election.

Pelham-Villiers was also elected MP for Wolverhampton and opted to sit there, causing a by-election.

 Third seat created.

 

 Third seat treated as new for 1865 election.

Sources

Politics of Lancashire
Parliamentary constituencies in North West England (historic)
Constituencies of the Parliament of the United Kingdom established in 1832
Constituencies of the Parliament of the United Kingdom disestablished in 1868